Peltigera malacea, commonly called veinless pelt or felt lichen, is a species of lichenized fungus in the family Peltigeraceae.

References

malacea
Lichen species
Lichens described in 1818
Taxa named by Erik Acharius
Lichens of North America
Lichens of Canada
Fungi without expected TNC conservation status